Terence  "Terry" Robert Arthur Bickers (born 6 September 1965 in Kensington, London) is an English musician and songwriter. A guitarist and singer, he is best known for his work as the original lead guitarist with The House of Love (from 1986 to 1989, and again from 2004 to 2020) and as the former frontman/guitarist for Levitation and Cradle. During the late 1980s and 1990s Bickers was hailed as one of Britain's leading young guitarists, as well as attracting plenty of press coverage due to his unconventional pronouncements.

Bickers's most recent work has been with singer-songwriter Pete Fijalkowski, with whom he released the album Broken Heart Surgery in July 2014. He is currently based in Brighton, England where he teaches music at the college Access To Music.

Biography and musical career

Early years
Terry Bickers was born in Kensington, London, and grew up in nearby Fulham into what he describes as "a family of big gamblers and card players. I learnt from them how to hold my hand back. They'd all be drinking and because I was only seven, I'd be straight, checking them out and learning from their behaviour." When he was twelve years old, his parents split up, an event which he later described as "my whole life falling down in front of me. The relationship between your parents is how you see the world at that age. You learn not to trust anything." Bickers would often cite this event as contributing to his later personal vulnerability and his consequent reactions to both people and to band politics.

Bickers's first significant band was the Northern Irish indie-rock band Colenso Parade, which he joined in 1985 on their move to London. He played on their Hallelujah Chorus EP and Glentoran album, both released in 1986 on Fire Records.

The House of Love
In 1986 Bickers left Colenso Parade to join The House of Love, playing the role of lead guitarist and creative foil to singer and songwriter Guy Chadwick. The House of Love rapidly gained critical acclaim in the British weekly music press (much of it focused on Bickers' intense psychedelic guitar approach). The band's 1988 debut album – also called The House of Love, and released on Creation Records – received glowing reviews and saw the Chadwick/Bickers partnership being compared to the Smiths partnership of Morrissey and Johnny Marr. Hotly tipped as being future stars, the band soon moved on to the major label Fontana and came under pressure to write more commercial singles.

Already a withdrawn character, Bickers had difficulty adjusting both to his musical celebrity and the demands of the record industry. During this time, although his playing remained acclaimed, he suffered from depression and drug abuse and his relationship with Chadwick began to break down. This culminated in a notorious episode during a House of Love tour in 1989, when Bickers set fire to banknotes in the back of the band's tour van while chanting "Breadhead!" at Chadwick. He was ejected from the band shortly afterwards (although his playing would feature on the band's second album, released the following year). Bickers would later describe the tour van event as a protest against The House of Love's commercialised state, commenting "That was frustration. I just found at the time that I didn't have the same aspirations as the rest of the band. I was more into exploring music than exploring the exploitation of markets around the globe. They were really into crusading. And winning. I wasn't." He would also confess to having had a nervous breakdown during this period, recalling "It was exhaustion... I kind of couldn't function as I did before and it's very frightening. It makes you stronger, the experience of something like that helps you build a resistance, because you have to in this day and age."

After leaving the band, Bickers sought greater stability, choosing to marry and have a daughter, Ella, in 1991. He has commented that part of his "difficult" reputation over the years (particularly in his House of Love days) came from his previous behaviour of "push(ing) love away. It was just fear, really. Fear of my own vulnerability. Fear of rejection maybe, being hurt. It was me doing battle with myself."

Levitation
In 1990, Bickers formed the psychedelic rock band Levitation with drummer David Francolini, former Cardiacs guitarist Bic Hayes, multi-instrumentalist Robert White (later of The Milk and Honey Band) and bass player Joe Allen (who went on to join Strangelove and was replaced by Laurence O'Keefe). As well as playing guitar, Bickers took on the role of lead singer in the band. The band quickly became known for their intense collective playing, and were hailed in both the underground and mainstream music press as new psychedelic heroes as well as potential rehabilitators of progressive rock. Levitation recorded a number of EPs (including the Coppelia EP, heralded by Melody Maker as "this generation's Marquee Moon,") and two albums – Coterie and Need For Not.

With Bickers already notorious for his time with House of Love, Levitation gained a good deal of press attention very quickly. Despite the band's collective approach (and Bickers' insistence that Levitation was a democracy), much of this attention was focussed on the eminently quotable Bickers himself. In interviews with the music press, Bickers would provide career-friendly quotes by, for example, citing an interest in the then-current dance and rave music scenes as well as the indie-rock and psychedelic music movements. However, he was equally likely to suggest that Levitation were considering performing in masks or carrying out a concert tour of Britain via canal, or to raise esoteric ideas such as Gaia theory or the possibilities of communicating with dolphins. Although reviewers continued to praise his skill as a musician, his schemes and philosophical ideas (though presented with sincerity) led to him being mocked and caricatured for his apparent eccentricity, leading to his reputation and nickname as "Bonkers Bickers".

Despite rave reviews and an excellent reputation as a live band, plus a growing fanbase, the band's career was set back by Bickers's refusal to tour America following an incident on the band's first American tour in which the band was caught in crossfire during a gun battle between police and a criminal gang. This led to tension between Bickers and the other members, culminating in Bickers departing the band, acrimoniously, in 1993. Bickers famously quit Levitation onstage during a London concert, announcing "We've lost it, haven't we?" Bic Hayes would later comment "It had happened a few times before that last gig but I think that we all knew very early on at (that) one that there was no going back again."

Years later, Bickers would speak about his departure with regret and shame, but claim that his mounting depression had had much to do with the manner of his departure. In 2018 he amicably reunited onstage with his former Levitation bandmate Bic Hayes, when he guested for the first time with the latter's psychedelic band ZOFFF.

Paradise Estate, Cradle, Monkey 7 and others
Within a week of leaving Levitation in 1993, Bickers teamed up with guitarist Clive Giblin (Alternative TV, Shock Headed Peters, Two Worlds Collide, Sol Invictus). The duo formed a band called Paradise Estate, named after the Television Personalities' track as they were both fans. They spent about six weeks writing and recording the songs that would convince Warner Bros to sign Bickers, following which the pair drifted apart (with Giblin leaving the band).

Bickers renamed the project Cradle and drafted in three new members. A year later, unhappy with the band, Bickers approached Giblin and asked him to rejoin Cradle (also recruiting former King Kurt drummer Daniel). This line up – together with Bickers' partner, singer Caroline Tree – spent the summer of 1994 locked away in a studio in Lincolnshire recording an album for Warner Bros. The band recorded almost 20 tracks in various forms (with fifteen finished and mixed) but this period was allegedly a difficult time for all concerned due to strong destructive external influences in several band members' personal lives. The end result was an album and single for Warner Bros, neither of which were released (although some copies of the single were pressed and reviewed in the music press). Once again Giblin jumped ship, and not long after Warner Bros dropped the band.

Moving to Rye in Sussex, Bickers put together a third line-up of Cradle with himself on guitar, vocals, and various instruments, Caroline Tree as co-lead singer (and main creative foil) and Ian Mundwyler on guitar, plus a floating cast of contributing musicians. Recording sessions for this project were more successful and Cradle released what would be their only completed album, Baba Yaga, in 1995. This displayed a divided approach, alternating distinctly between noisy indie rock songs (predominantly sung by Tree) and ghostly psychedelic material (predominantly sung by Bickers) which showed a much softer approach than either Levitation or The House of Love. (During this period, Bickers also played on Divan, the 1995 debut album by Oedipussy, a project headed by former The Perfect Disaster member Phil Parfitt).

In contrast to the reception afforded to Bickers' two previous bands, the press received Cradle with indifference or even contempt, with Caroline Tree being labelled as "the worst singer in the world" in a review in New Musical Express. Tree left the band shortly afterwards. Despite playing a few concerts with Bickers as lead vocalist, and more or less ditching the more conventional indie rock approaches in favour of dark psychedelia, Cradle did not last for much longer and quietly dissolved in 1996.

Bickers went on to work in production, resurfacing briefly in 1999 with a new band called Monkey 7 (also featuring Sam Smith and Nik Webb). In contrast to the serious intent of Bickers' previous bands, Monkey 7 were described as "Tony Bennett steaming headfirst into the last working remnants of Shaun Ryder" and "a lo-fi ska Blur playing for laffs." The band released one single, "The Snowy Peaks/It All Comes Back on You", on Anvil Recording Co. in 2001.

Return to The House of Love
In 2003, Bickers (now much more able to cope with his depressive tendencies due to courses of therapy and the martial art shintaido) reconciled with Guy Chadwick (who himself had suffered severe depression following the collapse of The House of Love). The two bonded over a new mutual sympathy, which in turn led to a reformation of The House of Love at the end of 2004. 

At the start of 2005 the reunited band released their first post-reformation album, Days Run Away; eight years later another album, She Paints Words in Red was released in the spring of 2013. In between and afterwards, the band toured intermittently. Bickers would continue as a member of The House of Love until 2020, when Chadwick put together an entirely different line-up to tour the United States.

Other current work

Pete Fij / Terry Bickers 
In 2009, Bickers joined up with Worthing resident Pete Fijalkowski (ex Adorable/Polak) for a new "stripped down" project. The pair began writing together as a duo (with Fijalkowski on vocals and acoustic guitar and Bickers on electric guitar), playing a few low-key concerts in early 2010. 
After a Kickerstarter campaign at the end of 2013, the pair self-released their debut album Broken Heart Surgery to critical acclaim in July 2014. They followed with a 2nd album, "We are Millionaires" in 2017 on Broadcast Records.

Montana Rain
Bickers currently works with a country-and-western covers band called Montana Rain, which also features singer Nicola Rain, bass player John Rain and barn-dance folk duo Pete and Mannie McClelland.

Other collaborations
Bickers' guitar playing features on Les Nouvelles Polyphonies Corses, a recording of Corsican polyphonic singing, and on some Heidi Berry recordings.

Selected discography

with Colenso Parade
Hallelujah Chorus EP, Fire Records, 1986
Glentoran album, Fire Records, 1986

with The House of Love
The House of Love (a.k.a. The German Album), Rough Trade Records/Creation Records, 1987 (reissued by Renascent Records, 2007) (early singles collection, initially only released in Germany)
The House of Love album, Creation Records, 1988
The House of Love (a.k.a. Fontana) album, Fontana Records, 1991
Days Run Away album, Art & Industry, 2005
She Paints Words in Red album, Cherry Red Records, 2013

with Levitation
Coppelia  EP, Ultimate Records, 1991
After Ever EP, Ultimate Records, 1991
Coterie  compilation album, Capitol Records, 1991/Ultimate Records, 1992
World Around EP, Ultimate Records, 1992
Need For Not album, Rough Trade Records, 1992
Even When Your Eyes Are Open EP, Capitol Records, 1994
Meanwhile Gardens album, Festival Records, 1994 (When Bickers left the band in 1993, his contributions to this already completed album were largely removed and his lead vocals were replaced by those of Steve Ludwin but some of his guitar playing and backing vocals remained on the record that was issued.)
Meanwhile Gardens album, Flashback Records, 2015 (The original version as completed before Bickers left the band)
Never Odd Or Even EP, Flashback Records, 2015 (3 more tracks from the Meanwhile Gardens sessions)

with Cradle
Baba Yaga album, Ultimate Records, 1995

with Monkey 7
The Snowy Peaks/It All Comes Back on You single, Anvil Recording Co., 2001

with Pete Fij / Terry Bickers 
Broken Heart Surgery Broadcast, 2014
We Are Millionaires Broadcast, 2017

References

External links
Official Terry Bickers website
A Levitation Fansite
Interview from 1992
Official Pete Fij / Terry Bickers site

1965 births
Living people
English rock guitarists
English male guitarists
English songwriters
English male singers
English rock singers
People from Fulham
British male songwriters
Levitation (band) members